Weekly Volcano was a weekly entertainment newspaper in based in Tacoma, Washington, United States. It served the southern Puget Sound region and reports on film, theater, food, art and music. The newspaper has 670 distribution points from Federal Way to Tumwater, reaching more than 92,000 readers every Thursday. It began publication on November 1, 2001, and was founded by publisher Ron Swarner. Swarner's brother Ken later took over as publisher. Weekly Volcano also published Northwest Military, which serves military families.

The newspaper organized the annual Tacoma Restaurant Week from 2008 onward. The Weekly Volcano was merged into the Ranger and Northwest Airlifter as an entertainment supplement in April 2013.

References

External links
 Weekly Volcano website

2001 establishments in Washington (state)
2013 disestablishments in Washington (state)
Alternative weekly newspapers published in the United States
Defunct newspapers published in Washington (state)
Defunct weekly newspapers
Mass media in Tacoma, Washington
Newspapers published in Washington (state)
Publications established in 2001
Publications disestablished in 2013